The Zanjero, sometimes known as the Water Overseer or Water Steward, was the official in charge of water management for the  city of Los Angeles in the 19th century. The position was considered to be more important than even the Mayor of Los Angeles during the city's rapid expansion in the mid-1800s, earning the highest salary of any official for many years.

Name
The title of Zanjero is a Spanish word, meaning someone who maintains a zanja (water trench). The position originally involved the maintenance and management of the trenches, such as Zanja Madre, which brought Los Angeles its water. As the city expanded, the position expanded to involve the management of larger water projects for Los Angeles.

List of zanjeros
There was a high degree of turnover in the position. Manuel F. Coronel was the first one appointed as Water Overseer on April 3, 1854. However, he resigned just two weeks later. His successor served only four months before he resigned.

Former overseers include:
Manuel F. Coronel
Cristobal Aguilar
William P. Meinzer
H. C. Cardwell
James H. Easton
Charles Pleasant
Damien Marchessault
Elijah Bettis
Oliver Stearns
Jesus Cruz

References

History of Los Angeles